Carob pod oil (Algaroba oil) is an edible oil pressed from carob beans, used medicinally.

The fatty acid composition of carob pod oil is:

References 

Vegetable oils